is a near-Earth asteroid, and at only  across and absolute magnitude 29.34 mag, it is thought to be the second smallest asteroid observed over multiple years, the smallest being 2006 RH120 with 29.5 mag. The asteroid is notable for reflecting about 60% of the light that hits it, making it one of the brightest near-earth asteroids ever seen.

Discovered by the Catalina Sky Survey on 12 October 2015, it was observed with several ground-based telescopes. Radar observations were also made using the Arecibo Observatory as it passed  from the Earth. Observations suggest its surface composition is similar to Aubrite meteorites, a rare class of high-albedo differentiated meteorites.

Its surface therefore most likely resembles a bare rock.

References

External links 
 
 
 

Minor planet object articles (unnumbered)

Astronomical objects discovered in 2015